Fool Britannia is a hidden camera sketch series which has aired since 1 September 2012 on ITV, and stars Dom Joly as he surprises members of the public with pranks. The first series aired for eight episodes.

The second series began airing on 5 October 2013 and consisted of six episodes.

Episodes

Series

Specials

References

2010s British television sketch shows
2012 British television series debuts
2013 British television series endings
ITV sketch shows
Hidden camera television series
Television series by ITV Studios
English-language television shows